Rhodambulyx schnitzleri is a species of moth of the family Sphingidae. It is known from western Yunnan in China and northern Thailand.

References

Smerinthini
Moths described in 1990